NA-172 Rahim Yar Khan-IV is a constituency for the National Assembly of Pakistan.

Election 2002 

General elections were held on 10 Oct 2002. Chaudhry Zaffar Iqbal Warriach of PPP won by 48,896 votes.

Election 2008 

General elections were held on 18 Feb 2008. Javed Iqbal Warraich of PPP won by 50,090 votes.

Election 2013 

General elections were held on 11 May 2013. Mian Imtiaz Ahmed of PML-N won by 106,595 votes with support of Mr.Amir Farooq and became the  member of National Assembly.

Election 2018 

General elections are scheduled to be held on 25 July 2018.

See also
NA-171 Rahim Yar Khan-III
NA-173 Rahim Yar Khan-V

References 

NA-196